The Old Hungarian script or Hungarian runes ('székely-magyar runiform', or ) is an alphabetic writing system used for writing the Hungarian language. Modern Hungarian is written using the Latin-based Hungarian alphabet. The term "old" refers to the historical priority of the script compared with the Latin-based one. The Old Hungarian script is a child system of the Old Turkic alphabet. 

The Hungarians settled the Carpathian Basin in 895. After the establishment of the Christian Hungarian kingdom, the old writing system was partly forced out of use during the rule of King Stephen, and the Latin alphabet was adopted. However, among some professions (e.g. shepherds who used a "rovás-stick" to officially track the number of animals) and in Transylvania, the script has remained in use by the Székely Magyars, giving its Hungarian name . The writing could also be found in churches, such as that in the commune of Atid.

Its English name in the ISO 15924 standard is Old Hungarian (Hungarian Runic).

Name 

History

Origins 
Scientists cannot give an exact date or origin for the script.

The origins of the Turkic scripts are uncertain. The scripts may be derived from Asian scripts such as the Pahlavi and Sogdian alphabets, or possibly from Kharosthi, all of which are in turn derived from the Aramaic script. Alternatively, according to some opinions, ancient Turkic runes descend from primaeval Turkic graphic logograms.

Speakers of Proto-Hungarian would have come into contact with Turkic peoples during the 7th or 8th century, in the context of the Turkic expansion, as is also evidenced by numerous Turkic loanwords in Proto-Hungarian.

All the letters but one for sounds which were shared by Turkic and Ancient Hungarian can be related to their Old Turkic counterparts. Most of the missing characters were derived by script internal extensions, rather than borrowings, but a small number of characters seem to derive from Greek, such as  'eF'.

The modern Hungarian term for this script (coined in the 19th century), derives from the verb  ('to score') which is derived from old Uralic, general Hungarian terminology describing the technique of writing ( 'to write',  'letter',  'knife, also: for carving letters') derive from Turkic, which further supports transmission via Turkic alphabets.

Medieval Hungary 

Epigraphic evidence for the use of the Old Hungarian script in medieval Hungary dates to the 10th century, for example, from Homokmégy. The latter inscription was found on a fragment of a quiver made of bone. Although there have been several attempts to interpret it, the meaning of it is still unclear.

In 1000, with the coronation of Stephen I of Hungary, Hungary (previously an alliance of mostly nomadic tribes) became a kingdom. The Latin alphabet was adopted as official script; however, Old Hungarian continued to be used in the vernacular.

The runic script was first mentioned in the 13th century Chronicle of Simon of Kéza, where he stated that the Székelys may use the script of the Blaks. Johannes Thuróczy wrote in the Chronica Hungarorum that the Székelys did not forget the Scythian letters and these are engraved on sticks by carving.

Early Modern period 
The Old Hungarian script became part of folk art in several areas during this period. In Royal Hungary, Old Hungarian script was used less, although there are relics from this territory, too.
There is another copy – similar to the Nikolsburg Alphabet – of the Old Hungarian alphabet, dated 1609. The inscription from Énlaka, dated 1668, is an example of the "folk art use".

There are a number of inscriptions ranging from the 17th to the early 19th centuries, including examples from Kibéd, Csejd, Makfalva, Szolokma, Marosvásárhely, Csíkrákos, Mezőkeresztes, Nagybánya, Torda, Felsőszemeréd, Kecskemét and Kiskunhalas.

Scholarly discussion 
Hungarian script was first described in late Humanist/Baroque scholarship by János Telegdy in his primer . Published in 1598, Telegdi's primer presents his understanding of the script and contains Hungarian texts written with runes, such as the Lord's Prayer.

In the 19th century, scholars began to research the rules and the other features of the Old Hungarian script. From this time, the name  ('runic writing') began to re-enter the popular consciousness in Hungary, and script historians in other countries began to use the terms "Old Hungarian", and so on. Because the Old Hungarian script had been replaced by Latin, linguistic researchers in the 20th century had to reconstruct the alphabet from historic sources. Gyula Sebestyén, an ethnographer and folklorist, and Gyula (Julius) Németh, a philologist, linguist, and Turkologist, did the lion's share of this work.

Popular revival 

Beginning with Adorján Magyar in 1915, the script has been promulgated as a means for writing modern Hungarian. These groups approached the question of representation of the vowels of modern Hungarian in different ways. Adorján Magyar made use of characters to distinguish a/á and e/é but did not distinguish the other vowels by length. A school led by Sándor Forrai from 1974 onward did, however, distinguish i/í, o/ó, ö/ő, u/ú, and ü/ű. The revival has become part of a significant ideological nationalist subculture present not only in Hungary (largely centered in Budapest), but also amongst the Hungarian diaspora, particularly in the United States and Canada.

Old Hungarian has seen other usages in the modern period, sometimes in association with or referencing Hungarian neopaganism, similar to the way in which Norse neopagans have taken up the Germanic runes, and Celtic neopagans have taken up the ogham script for various purposes.

Controversies 
Not all scholars agree with the "Old Hungarian" notion, mainly based on the actual literary facts. The linguist and sociolinguist Klára Sándor told in an interview that most of the "romantic" statements about the script appear to be false. According to her analysis, the origin of the writing is probably runiform (and with high probability its origins are in the western Turkic runiform writings) and it's not a different writing system and contrary to the sentiment the writing is neither Hungarian nor Székely-Hungarian; it is a Székely writing since there are no authentic findings outside the historic Székely lands (mainly today's Transylvania); the only writing found around 1000 AD had a different writing system. While it may have been sporadically used in Hungary its usage was not widespread. The "revived" writing (in the 1990s) was artificially expanded with (various) "new" letters which were unneeded in the past since the writing was cleanly phonetic, or the long vowels which were not present back in the time. The shape of many letters were substantially changed from the original.
She stated that no works since 1915 has reached the expected quality of the state of the linguistic sciences, and many was influenced by various agendas.

The use of the script often has a political undertone as it is often used along with irredentist or nationalist propaganda, and they can be found from time to time in graffiti with a variety of content. Since most of the people cannot read the script it has led to various controversies, for example when the activists of the Hungarian Two-tailed Dog Party (opposition) exchanged the rovas sign of the city Érd to szia 'Hi!', which stayed unnoticed a month.

Epigraphy 

The inscription corpus includes:
 A labeled crest etched into stone from Pécs, late 13th century (Label: aBA SZeNTjeI vaGYUNK aKI eSZTeR ANna erZSéBeT; We are the saints [nuns] of Aba; who are Esther, Anna and Elizabeth.)
 Rod calendar, around 1300, copied by Luigi Ferdinando Marsigli in 1690. It contains several feasts and names, thus it is one of the most extensive runic records.
 Nicholsburg alphabet 
 Runic record in Istanbul, 1515.
 Székelyderzs: a brick with runic inscription, found in the Unitarian church
 Énlaka runic inscription, discovered by Balázs Orbán in 1864
 Székelydálya: runic inscription, found in the Calvinist church
 The inscription from Felsőszemeréd (Horné Semerovce), Slovakia (15th century)

Characters 
The runic alphabet included 42 letters. As in the Old Turkic script, some consonants had two forms, one to be used with back vowels (a, á, o, ó, u, ú) and another for front vowels (e, é, i, í, ö, ő, ü, ű). The names of the consonants are always pronounced with a vowel. In the old alphabet, the consonant-vowel order is reversed, unlike today's pronunciation (ep rather than pé). This is because the oldest inscriptions lacked vowels and were rarely written down, similar to other ancient languages' consonant-writing systems (Arabic, Hebrew, Aramaic, etc.). The alphabet did not contain letters for the phonemes dz and dzs of modern Hungarian, since these are relatively recent developments in the language's history. Nor did it have letters corresponding to the Latin q, w, x and y. The modern revitalization movement has created symbols for these; in Unicode encoding, they are represented as ligatures.

For more information about the transliteration's pronunciation, see Hungarian alphabet.

The Old Hungarian runes also include some non-alphabetical runes which are not ligatures but separate signs. These are identified in some sources as "" (likely a misspelling of ). Further research is needed to define their origin and traditional usage. Some common examples are:
TPRUS: 
ENT:  
TPRU: 
NAP: 
EMP:  
UNK:  
US:  
AMB:

Features 
Old Hungarian letters were usually written from right to left on sticks. Later, in Transylvania, they appeared on several media. Writings on walls also were right to left and not boustrophedon style (alternating direction right to left and then left to right).

The numbers are almost the same as the Roman, Etruscan, and Chuvash numerals. Numbers of livestock were carved on tally sticks and the sticks were then cut in two lengthwise to avoid later disputes.

 Ligatures are common. (Note: the Hungarian runic script employed a number of ligatures. In some cases, an entire word was written with a single sign similar to a bind rune.) The Unicode standard supports ligatures explicitly by using the zero width joiner between the two characters.
 There are no lower or upper case letters, but the first letter of a proper name was often written a bit larger. Though the Unicode standard has upper and lowercase letters, which are the same in shape, the difference is only their size.
 The writing system did not always mark vowels (similar to many Asian writing systems). The rules for vowel inclusion were as follows:
 If there are two vowels side by side, both have to be written, unless the second could be readily determined.
 The vowels have to be written if their omission created ambiguity. (Example:  –  can be interpreted as  –  (wheel) and  –  (rounded), thus the writer had to include the vowels to differentiate the intended words.)
 The vowel at the end of the word must be written.
 Sometimes, especially when writing consonant clusters, a consonant was omitted. This is a phonologic process, with the script reflecting the exact surface realization.

Text example 

Text from Csíkszentmárton, 1501.
Runes originally written as ligatures are underlined.

Unicode transcription: 

Interpretation in old Hungarian: "ÚRNaK SZÜLeTéSéTÜL FOGVÁN ÍRNaK eZeRÖTSZÁZeGY eSZTeNDŐBE MÁTYáS
JÁNOS eSTYTáN KOVÁCS CSINÁLTáK MÁTYáSMeSTeR GeRGeLYMeSTeRCSINÁLTÁK
G IJ A aS I LY LY LT A" (The letters actually written in the runic text are written with uppercase in the transcription.)

Interpretation in modern Hungarian: "(Ezt) az Úr születése utáni 1501. évben írták. Mátyás, János, István kovácsok csinálták. Mátyás mester (és) Gergely mester csinálták gijas ily ly lta"

English translation: "(This) was written in the 1501st year of our Lord. The smiths Matthias, John (and) Stephen did (this). Master Matthias (and) Master Gregory did (uninterpretable)

Unicode 

After many proposals Old Hungarian was added to the Unicode Standard in June, 2015 with the release of version 8.0.

The Unicode block for Old Hungarian is U+10C80–U+10CFF:

Pre-Unicode encodings 
A set of closely related 8-bit code pages exist, devised in the 1990s by Gabor Hosszú. These were mapped to Latin-1 or Latin-2 character set fonts. After installing one of them and applying their formatting to the document – because of the lack of capital letters – runic characters could be entered in the following way: those letters which are unique letters in today's Hungarian orthography are virtually lowercase ones, and can be written by simply pressing the specific key; and since the modern digraphs equal to separate rovás letters, they were encoded as 'uppercase' letters, i.e. in the space originally restricted for capitals. Thus, typing a lowercase g will produce the rovás character for the sound marked with Latin script g, but entering an uppercase G will amount to a rovás sign equivalent to a digraph gy in Latin-based Hungarian orthography.

Gallery

See also 
 National symbols of Hungary

Notes

References

English 
 Gábor Hosszú (2011): Heritage of Scribes. The Relation of Rovas Scripts to Eurasian Writing Systems. First edition. Budapest: Rovas Foundation, fully available from Google Books
 Edward D. Rockstein: "The Mystery of the Székely Runes", Epigraphic Society Occasional Papers, Vol. 19, 1990, pp. 176–183

Hungarian 
  (New Hungarian Encyclopaedia) – Akadémiai Kiadó, Budapest, 1962 (Volume 5) 
 Gyula Sebestyén: , Budapest, 1915

Latin 
 J. Thelegdi: , Batavia, 1598

External links 

 Hungarian Runes / Rovás on Omniglot
  Rovásírás (Gábor Hosszú)
  Kiszely István: A magyar nép őstörténete
  Learning Rovas
  The Living Rovas
  Hungarian Rovas Portal
  Szekely-Hungarian Rovas
 Szekely-Hungarian Rovas on RovasPedia
 Old Hungarian Unicode fonts
 ALPHABETUM by Juan José Marcos (commercial font)
 Noto Sans Old Hungarian
 Old Hungarian by Zsolt Sz. Sztupák
 OptimaModoki by Dare-demo Iie
 TWB01x SMP fonts by Thomas Buchleither (archived on 2019-07-17)

Alphabet
Hungarian language
Obsolete writing systems
Hungarian
 
Right-to-left writing systems